Charles Calvert may refer to:

 Charles Calvert, 3rd Baron Baltimore (1637–1715), Proprietary Governor of the Province of Maryland
 Charles Calvert, 5th Baron Baltimore (1699–1751), Proprietary Governor of the Province of Maryland
 Charles Benedict Calvert (1808–1864), U.S. Congressman from the sixth district of Maryland
 Charles Calvert (MP) (1768–1832), English brewer and Member of Parliament
 Charles Calvert (painter) (1785–1852), English landscape painter
 Charles Alexander Calvert (1828–1879), actor and theatre manager
 Charles Calvert (governor) (1688–1734), Governor of Maryland, 1720–1727
 Charles Calvert (director), British film director
 Charles Calvert (Cambridge University cricketer) (1825–1882), English cricketer
 Charles Calvert (cricketer, born 1833) (1833–1905), English cricketer
 Chuck Calvert (born 1930), member of the Ohio House of Representatives